The Hope Valley Reservoir is a  service reservoir in Hope Valley, South Australia, a suburb of Adelaide, South Australia.

When completed in 1873 it was the second reservoir constructed in Adelaide; it is the oldest still in use in South Australia. Water is transferred from the River Torrens via a tunnel and aqueduct. The river is also used to transfer water from the Kangaroo Creek and Millbrook reservoirs.

In December 2021, the reservoir was opened to the public for the first time for activities including walking, running, cycling and picnicking.

References

Dams completed in 1873
Geography of Adelaide
Embankment dams
Earth-filled dams
Dams in South Australia
Reservoirs in South Australia